John King, USA is an hour-long television news show hosted by John King on CNN. The show debuted on March 22, 2010,
airing at 6:00PM ET, originally at 7:00PM ET until Erin Burnett OutFront replaced the original time slot on October 3, 2011. The final broadcast aired on June 29, 2012. A third hour of The Situation Room with Wolf Blitzer took over the time slot.

References

External links
 

CNN original programming
2010 American television series debuts
2012 American television series endings
2010s American television talk shows